Hugh Hamshaw "Ham" Thomas, MBE, FRS, FLS, (29 May 1885 in Wrexham, Wales – 30 June 1962 in Cambridge, England), was a British paleobotanist.

Education
Thomas was born in Wrexham the son of J.T. Thomas and educated at Grove Park School, Wrexham and Downing College, Cambridge. He became a university lecturer in botany and a fellow of the college. He was also curator of the museum in the Botany Department. During World War I he served a Photographic Officer in the Royal Flying Corps in Europe and the Middle East.

He was elected a Fellow of the Royal Society in May, 1934. His candidature citation read: "His researches cover a wide field; to Palaeobotany he has made several original contributions of great value; notably on the leaves of Calamites (Phil Tran, 1911), on the structure of Cycadean fronds, on new genera, e.g., 'Williamsoniella' (Phil Trans, 1915); the Caytoniales, a paper of exceptional importance (Phil Trans, 1925); also several papers on Jurassic floras, etc. Dr Thomas is well known as an authority on aircraft photography and was one of the first to demonstrate its application to the survey of vegetation. His work is characterized by originality and by the skilful use of new methods of technique."

He was president of the Linnean Society of London from 1955 to 1958 and was awarded their prestigious Darwin-Wallace Medal in 1958 and their Linnean Medal in 1960.

During the Second World War, he was a photographic interpreter at RAF Medmenham with the rank of Wing Commander, where he worked on the interpretation of aerial reconnaissance photographs. Whilst being shown around the PI centre at Medmenham, after being at a meeting including Hamshaw Thomas, afterwards, out of earshot, South African Prime Minister Jan Smuts turned to his companion and said; "Do you know, that fellow" - (referring to Hamshaw Thomas) - "is the world's leading palaeobotanist" - Smuts was a renowned botanist himself. As "Chief of Third Phase Interpretation", in 1943 it was Hamshaw Thomas who was responsible, along with his Army opposite number, Major Norman Falcon, for initiating the Allied investigation of the German research centre at Peenemünde

He died in Cambridge in 1962.

References

External links
Hamshaw Thomas' obituary in Flight magazine written by Constance Babington Smith

1885 births
1962 deaths
British botanists
Fellows of the Royal Society
Presidents of the Linnean Society of London
Royal Air Force officers
Members of the Order of the British Empire